Tengku Raihani (11 October 1911 – 22 September 1993) was the Queen consort of Brunei as the wife of the 27th Sultan of Brunei, Ahmad Tajuddin. She is the daughter of Sultan Sulaiman of Selangor and the consort, Cik Puan Maimunah binti Abdullah.

Early life 
Tengku Raihani was born on October 11, 1911, in Jugra, Kuala Langat, at Istana Bandar Temasya.

Marriage 
Tengku Raihani married Sultan Ahmad Tajuddin on April 30, 1934, at Istana Negara in Klang in accordance with Selangor and Brunei's royal traditions. The relationship between the royal families of Selangor and Brunei was created as a result of this marriage. The Jami'ah Al-Rahmah Mosque in Klang hosted the wedding ceremony on 6 May 1934. The prince's bridal party included Raihani's mother-in-law Pengiran Anak Fatimah, his younger brother Prince Omar Ali Saifuddien, as well as state dignitaries, members of the royal family of Brunei, including bearers of grandeur, and a group of naubats. On March 17, 1940, Tengku Raihani was appointed Tengku Ampuan Raihani and had one daughter with him, Princess Nor Ehsani, born 1935. Her tenure came to an end after the sudden death of her husband in Singapore on 4 June 1950. She immediately relayed the news through telegram to his brother Omar Ali Saifuddien.

She married Raja Kamaluddin ibni Raja Harun Al-Rashid, a son of Raja Harun Al-Rashid, on Saturday, August 18, 1956, at the Istana Bukit Kota in Klang, at the age of 47, following the passing of Ahmad Tajuddin. She married a member of the Perak state royal family when he was 38 years old. Kamaluddin is the brother to her first husband, grandson of Sultan Idris Murshidul Azzam Shah of Perak.

According to Christoper Buyer on the Royalark website, Tengku Ampuan Raihani was formerly married to Raja Dato' Badri Shah, the younger brother of Raja Kamaluddin. Raja Izaliah, the daughter of Dato' Raja Badri Shah, refuted this claim, nevertheless.

Death
Kidney cancer claimed the life of Tengku Ampuan Raihani on September 22, 1993, and she was laid to rest in the Tengku Ampuan Tomb Building at the Sultan Sulaiman Mosque in Kelang.

References

1911 births
1993 deaths
Malaysian Muslims
Malaysian royalty
Bruneian royalty
Queens consort
Daughters of monarchs